is a Japanese actor and singer.

Born , he graduated from the Ashikaga Institute of Technology.

He has been arrested several times, and served prison terms, for various offences, among others illegal drug use.

Discography (selection) 
 1991 First (Fāsuto)
 1994 
 2001 
 2003 Oyaji / Umi ni Utaō (Oyaji /  Oyaji / Umi ni Utaō)

Filmography (selection)
 
 
 
 
 
Truck Yaro: Otoko Ippiki Momojirō (1977) Kaoru Murase
Tantei Monogatari (episode 20) (1980)

References

External links

Japanese male actors
1952 births
Living people
People from Kitakyushu
Japanese people convicted of drug offenses